Seven Bridges Road is the second album by pioneer country rock musician Steve Young.

Track listing
All tracks composed by Steve Young; except where indicated
"Seven Bridges Road" - 3:22
"My Oklahoma"  (Cheryl A. Young) - 2:58
"The White Trash Song" - 2:50
"I Can't Hold Myself in Line"  (Merle Haggard) - 2:15
"I Begin to See Design"  (Steve Young, Cheryl A. Young) - 2:56
"Long Way to Hollywood" - 3:49
"Many Rivers" - 2:57
"Lonesome, On'ry and Mean" - 3:30
"Come Sit By My Side"  (Fred Carter, Jr.) - 2:56
"True Note" - 2:55
"Ragtime Blue Guitar" - 2:45
"Montgomery in the Rain" - 4:08

BLUE CANYON RECORDS 1973 re-issue track listing:

1. Seven Bridges Road
2. My Oklahoma
3. The White Trash Song
4. I Can't Hold Myself In Line
5. I Begin To See Design
6. Long Way To Hollywood
7. Many Rivers
8. Lonesome, On'ry And Mean
9. Come Sit By My Side
10. True Note
11. Ragtime Blue Guitar
12. Montgomery In The Rain

ROUNDER RECORDS 1981 re-issue track listing:

1. Seven Bridges Road
2. Montgomery In The Rain
3. Ragtime Blue Guitar
4. Long Way To Hollywood
5. Down in the Flood
6. Ballad of William Sycamore
7. My Oklahoma
8. Wild Goose
9. Days of 49
10. Lonesome, On'ry And Mean

The Ace Records cd, 'SEVEN BRIDGES ROAD - THE COMPLETE RECORDINGS', combines the Reprise Records version of the LP with additional tracks from the other two versions, plus a non-LP single.

Personnel
Steve Young - guitar, vocals
Pete Drake - steel guitar
Weldon Myrick - steel guitar
Josh Graves - dobro
Buddy Spicher - fiddle
Charlie McCoy - harmonica
David Briggs - keyboards
Fred Carter, Jr. - bass
D.J. Fontana - drums
Bobby Thompson - guitar
Junior Brown - guitar
Ray Edenton - guitar
Bob Moore - guitar
John Goldthwaite - guitar
Dale Sellers - guitar
Pete Wade - guitar
Jerry Smith - keyboards
William Ackerman - drums
Jerry Carrigan - drums
Henry Strzelecki - bass
Paul Tannen - vocals
Ginger Holladay - vocals
Mary Holladay - vocals

Production
Producer: David Briggs
Recording Engineer: unknown
Art Direction: unknown
Photography: unknown
Liner notes: unknown

References

Steve Young (musician) albums
1972 albums
Albums produced by David Briggs (producer)
Reprise Records albums